Aptilotus is a genus of flies belonging to the family Lesser Dung flies.

Species
A. anapterus (Papp & Roháček, 1981)
A. appendix Papp, 1991
A. avolans (Roháček & Papp, 1983)
A. beckeri (Duda, 1918)
A. besucheti (Papp, 1981)
A. binotatus Marshall in Marshall & Smith, 1990
A. borealis Malloch, 1913
A. carbonicolor (Richards, 1959)
A. concavus (Spuler, 1925)
A. cruciatus Marshall, 1983
A. franzi (Papp & Roháček, 1981)
A. glabrifrons Marshall in Marshall & Smith, 1990
A. gomerensis (Papp & Roháček, 1981)
A. longinervis Hayashi, 1989
A. luctuosus (Spuler, 1925)
A. luteoscapus Marshall, 1983
A. martini Wheeler & Marshall, 1989
A. nigrimera Marshall, 1997
A. nigriphallus Marshall in Marshall & Smith, 1990
A. nigriscapus Marshall, 1983
A. nigritibia Marshall, 1997
A. paradoxus Mik, 1898
A. parvipennis (Spuler, 1924)
A. pilifemoratus (Papp & Roháček, 1981)
A. pogophallus Marshall in Marshall & Smith, 1990
A. politus (Williston, 1893)
A. pulex (Richards, 1967)
A. rufiscapus Marshall in Marshall & Smith, 1990
A. spatulatus Marshall, 1983
A. spinistylus Marshall in Marshall & Smith, 1990
A. thaii (Papp, 1989)
A. zumbadoi Marshall, 1997

References

Sphaeroceridae
Muscomorph flies of Europe
Diptera of Asia
Diptera of South America
Diptera of North America
Sphaeroceroidea genera